1981 riots may refer to:

 1981 England riots
 1981 Brixton riot
 1981 Chapeltown riots 
 1981 Handsworth riots
 1981 Moss Side riot
 1981 Toxteth riots
 1981 Hong Kong riots